Enyo lugubris, the mournful sphinx, is a moth of the  family Sphingidae. It is found from Argentina and Paraguay to Uruguay, Venezuela, Guyana, Suriname, French Guiana, Colombia, Ecuador, Peru, Brazil and the West Indies through Belize, Guatemala, Honduras, El Salvador, Nicaragua, Costa Rica and Panama to Mexico and the United States, where it has been recorded from Arizona east to Florida and north to South Carolina. Strays have been recorded from Arkansas, north to Illinois, Michigan and New York.

The wingspan is 50–60 mm. The body and wings are dark brown. The forewing has a large black patch covering most of the outer half of the wing. There is a pale tan cell spot, and a fairly straight median line to the inside of the cell spot.

Adults are on wing year round in the tropics (including southern Florida and Louisiana). Further north, they are on wing from August to November.

The larvae probably feed on Vitus tiliifolia and other Vitaceae species, such as Vitis, Cissus and Ampelopsis. In Florida larvae have been reported on Cissus sicyoides and Ampelopsis arborea.

References

Subspecies
Enyo lugubris lugubris
Enyo lugubris delanoi (Kernbach, 1962) (Galapagos Islands)

External links
Mournful sphinx Butterflies and Moths of North America

Enyo (moth)
Moths described in 1771
Taxa named by Carl Linnaeus